The 2013 Cachantún Cup was a professional tennis tournament played on clay courts. It was the sixth edition of the tournament which was part of the 2013 ATP Challenger Tour. It took place in Santiago, Chile between 4 and 10 March.

ATP entrants

Seeds

 1 Rankings are as of February 25, 2013.

Other entrants
The following players received wildcards into the singles main draw:
  Christian Garín
  Gonzalo Lama
  Nicolas Massú
  Matías Sborowitz

The following players received entry as a special exempt into the singles main draw:
  Renzo Olivo

The following players received entry from the qualifying draw:
  Andrea Collarini
  Jozef Kovalík
  Pere Riba
  Juan Carlos Sáez

Doubles main draw entrants

Seeds

1 Rankings as of February 24, 2013.

Other entrants
The following pairs received wildcards into the doubles main draw:
  Jorge Aguilar /  Nicolás Massú
  Christian Garín /  Gonzalo Lama
  Hans Podlipnik /  Juan Carlos Sáez

Champions

Singles

 Facundo Bagnis def.  Thiemo de Bakker, 7–6(7–2), 7–6(7–3)

Doubles

 Marcelo Demoliner /  João Souza def.  Federico Delbonis /  Diego Junqueira, 7–5, 6–1

External links
Official website

Cachantun Cup
Cachantún Cup (ATP)
March 2013 sports events in South America
2013 in Chilean tennis